Thessalon Municipal Airport  was located  north of Thessalon, Ontario, Canada.

References

Defunct airports in Ontario